The Blood of Gods is the fourteenth album by thrash metal band Gwar. It was released on October 20, 2017 by Metal Blade Records. It is the band's first album without founding member Dave Brockie, who portrayed Oderus Urungus, due to his heroin overdose death on March 23, 2014. The album is also the first to feature Michael Bishop since 1999's We Kill Everything, portraying the newest character, lead singer Blöthar the Berserker, as opposed to his role as the original Beefcake the Mighty.

Overview
The album's description reads:

"The Blood of Gods, is nothing less than a sacred text chronicling the rise of humanity against their makers, and the massive battle between Gwar and the forces of all that is uptight and wrong with the world (War on GWAR). Along the way, the band challenges the sins of their great mistake, from politics (El Presidente), pollution (Swarm), and organized religion (Crushed By the Cross), to fast food (Death to Dickie Duncan), and factory farming (Auroch). Humans are shown as what they are; a parasitical disease that must be eradicated before they suck the planet dry.

The Blood of Gods is the first Gwar album without the band's fallen leader, Oderus Urungus. The title of the album refers to the loss of Oderus and the struggles and triumphs that produced the new sound of the band. Born of adversity, The Blood of Gods is a sonic scar... a question asked and answered... Death cannot kill Gwar. Nothing can."

During their set on the first day of the 2017 Vans Warped Tour, the band debuted "Fuck This Place", a tribute to Oderus Urungus.

Track listing 

 "Fuck This Place" contains an unlisted orchestral reprise of "War on Gwar" after the main song concludes. Vinyl pressings of the album feature a re-ordered track listing and place the reprise at the end of side C, following "Crushed By the Cross."

Personnel 
 Mike Bishop (Blöthar the Berserker) – lead vocals, bass on "Viking Death Machine" and "Crushed By the Cross"
 Brent Purgason (Pustulus Maximus) – lead guitar, backing vocals, lead vocals on "Crushed By the Cross", additional vocals on "El Presidente" and "Death to Dickie Duncan"
 Mike Derks (Balsac the Jaws of Death) – rhythm guitar, backing vocals, additional vocals on "El Presidente"
 Jamison Land (Beefcake the Mighty) – bass, backing vocals, additional vocals on "El Presidente" and "Fuck This Place", glockenspiel
 Brad Roberts (Jizmak Da Gusha) – drums, percussion, additional vocals on "El Presidente" and "Fuck This Place"
 Matt Maguire (Sawborg Destructo) – lead vocals on "The Sordid Soliloquy of Sawborg Destructo"
 Bob Gorman (Bonesnapper) – spoken words at the end of "If You Want Blood"
 MC Chris (Dickie Duncan) – additional vocals on "Death to Dickie Duncan" and "Fuck This Place"
 Jenna Ottinger – additional vocals on "War on Gwar" and "Crushed By the Cross"
 JW Adkins – orchestral arrangement on "War on Gwar" reprise
 Danny T. Levin – all horns and horn arrangements on "El Presidente"
 Jonah Kane-West – B3 organ on "Viking Death Machine", "I'll Be Your Monster", and "Phantom Limb"
 Nicole Roberts – additional percussion, tambourine, vibraslap, and Tibetan chimes
 Mark Kilborn – additional sound design
 Ronan Chris Murphy – production, keyboards, additional percussion, and backing vocals

Charts

References

External links 

2017 albums
Gwar albums
Metal Blade Records albums